Deanne Cynthia Rose (born March 3, 1999) is a Canadian professional soccer player who plays as a forward for FA Women's Super League club Reading and the Canada national team.

In August 2016, Rose helped Canada win their second Olympic bronze medal after scoring the game-opening goal during the third-place match against Brazil. In August 2021, she helped Canada win the gold medal at the Tokyo Olympics.

Early life 
Born in New Tecumseth, Ontario to Jamaican parents, Rose began playing soccer at the age of four. Raised in Alliston, Rose attended Ernest Cumberland Elementary School in Alliston, Ontario, and later Saint Thomas Aquinas Catholic Secondary School in Tottenham, Ontario. She played club soccer for Scarborough GS United. In 2015, she was one of six players to be nominated for the BMO Canadian Player of the Year (Canada Soccer Women's U-17 Program).

College career 
Rose joined the Gators in 2017. On August 20, she scored her first goal in a 5–0 win over Troy. As a freshman, she recorded 9 goals, including five game-winners, and provided 3 assists.

Club career 
In January 2021, Rose was selected 10th overall in the 2021 NWSL Draft by the North Carolina Courage but did not join the team. In December 2021, North Carolina traded Rose's NWSL playing rights to the Orlando Pride during the 2022 NWSL Draft in exchange for a third-round pick.

Reading FC 
On July 28, 2021, Rose signed a two-year contract with Reading of the English FA Women's Super League. In her first game of the 2022-23 season, she would rupture her Achilles tendon, forcing her to miss significant playing time.

International career 

Rose earned her first cap for Canada's senior national team in December 2015 at the age of 16.
In February 2016, she scored her first two goals for the team against Guyana helping Canada win 5–0 during the group stage of the 2016 CONCACAF Women's Olympic Qualifying Championship. She scored her third tournament goal during the semifinal against Costa Rica helping Canada win 3–1 and qualify for the 2016 Rio Olympics. Canada advanced to the final where they were defeated by the United States 2–0.

In August 2016, she helped Canada win their second Olympic bronze medal after scoring the game-opening goal during the third-place match against Brazil, in which Canada won 2–1. Moreover, she became the youngest female Olympic goalscorer, aged 17 years and 169 days. On May 25, 2019, she was named to the roster for the 2019 FIFA Women's World Cup.

In August 2021, during the finals of the 2020 Olympic Games in Tokyo, Japan, Rose scored the tying penalty during the shootout. The Canadians went on to win the gold medal, becoming the first Canadian soccer team to do so in 117 years.

Career statistics

Club 
.

International goals

Honours 
Canada
 Summer Olympics: 2021; bronze medal: 2012, 2016
 Algarve Cup: 2016
Individual
 Canadian U-17 Player of the Year: 2016

Notes

References

External links 
 
 

1999 births
Living people
Canadian women's soccer players
Canada women's international soccer players
Canadian expatriate sportspeople in England
Women's association football forwards
Footballers at the 2016 Summer Olympics
Olympic soccer players of Canada
Olympic bronze medalists for Canada
Olympic medalists in football
Medalists at the 2016 Summer Olympics
Soccer people from Ontario
Canadian sportspeople of Jamaican descent
Expatriate women's footballers in England
Sportspeople from Simcoe County
Black Canadian women's soccer players
Florida Gators women's soccer players
2019 FIFA Women's World Cup players
North Carolina Courage draft picks
Footballers at the 2020 Summer Olympics
Medalists at the 2020 Summer Olympics
Olympic gold medalists for Canada
Expatriate women's soccer players in the United States
Canadian expatriate women's soccer players